Order of Little Bedlam aka Bedlam Club was a gentlemen's drinking club, founded in 1684 by John Cecil, 5th Earl of Exeter of Burghley House, and lapsing on his death in 1700. In 1705 it was reconvened by his son, John Cecil, 6th Earl of Exeter as grand master ‘Lion’, his brother William as ‘Panther’ and brother Charles as ‘Bull’. Each member of the club had his portrait painted and was associated with a particular animal. The venue of the Club is thought to be "The Bull and Swan" at Stamford, Lincolnshire. The Billiard Room at Burghley House still displays six oval portraits of members of the 5th Earl’s drinking club.

A Burghley House document records details of the club in 1705: 

Members included:

John Earl of Exeter, Great Master – Lyon 
Earl of Denbigh - Tyger 
Lord Lexington - Lamb 
Lord Howe - Hare 
George Crook Esq - Wolf 
Sir Thomas Barker (1648-1707) - Ram 
Hon. John Verney - Pardus [asterisked to indicated Male Panther] 
Henry Nevile - Fox 
Samuel Tryon Esq - Terrier 
Sir Godfrey Kneller - Unicorn 
Richard Sherard Esq - Mule 
George Leafield Esq - Guineapig 
Sir Thomas Mackworth - Badger 
Charles Tryon Esq - Otter 
William, Duke of Devonshire - Leopard 
Baptist Earl of Gainsborough - Greyhound 
Anthony Palmer Esq - Elephant 
Hon. John Noel - Wild Horse 
Hon. Charles Bertie - Stag 
Hon. James Griffin - Wild Boar 
Hon. William Cecil – Panther 
Thomas Hatcher Esq – Bear 
Antonio Verrio – Porcupine 
Sir James Robinson – Buck 
Timothy Lanoy Esq – Antelope 
Hon. Charles Cecil - Bull
Sir Isaac Newton
Gregory Hascard, Dean of Windsor – Cock

The temperamental Antonio Verrio, aptly named 'Porcupine', was responsible for a great deal of the very detailed art work in Burghley House.  He quarrelled with most of the house occupants, particularly the cook, and painted her on one of the ceilings as the goddess of plenty, amply endowed with four extra breasts.

References

Clubs and societies in England